Silvia Fuselli (born in Cecina, July 1, 1981) is an Italian footballer who currently plays as a striker for Fimauto Valpolicella in Serie A. She has also played for Agliana, Torino, Torres, Verona and Brescia, and she has been a member of the Italian national team.

She debuted with the Italian national team on March 29, 2006 in a qualifying match for the 2007 World Cup against Greece. She scored 3 goals at the 2007 Algarve Cup and contributed to Italy's qualification for the Euro 2009 with 2 goals throughout the qualification stage, subsequently playing 24 minutes in two matches in Finland.

Honours
Torres Calcio Femminile
 Serie A 2009–10, 2010–11, 2011–12, 2012–13
 Coppa Italia, 2007–08, 2010–11
 Supercoppa Italiana, 2009, 2010, 2011, 2012, 2013
 Italy Women's Cup, 2008

References

 Player profile from UEFA

External links
 Biographical details and Interview at calciodonne.it 

1981 births
Living people
Italian women's footballers
Italy women's international footballers
People from Cecina, Tuscany
Torres Calcio Femminile players
A.S.D. AGSM Verona F.C. players
A.C.F. Brescia Calcio Femminile players
Serie A (women's football) players
Women's association football forwards
Torino Women A.S.D. players
Sportspeople from the Province of Livorno
Footballers from Tuscany